Shobha Fadnavis is a Maharashtrian politician from the Bharatiya Janata Party. She is a member of the Maharashtra Legislative Council and a former minister in Government of Maharashtra. She hails from Mul, Chandrapur district. She represented Saoli Vidhan Sabha constituency from 1990 to 2004 until the constituency was abolished in 2008.She is the aunt of two term Former Chief Minister of Maharashtra Devendra Fadnavis.

She has written several books during her political career such as Pratyancha (Biography) and Dhandola Sheticha (On Farmers).

References

Bharatiya Janata Party politicians from Maharashtra
Living people
People from Chandrapur district
Women in Maharashtra politics
Members of the Maharashtra Legislative Council
Members of the Maharashtra Legislative Assembly
State cabinet ministers of Maharashtra
Marathi politicians
21st-century Indian women politicians
21st-century Indian politicians
Women state cabinet ministers of India
Year of birth missing (living people)